Cephalotaxus griffithii, commonly called Griffith's plum yew, is a coniferous shrub or small tree in the family Taxaceae. It is endemic to northern India, northern Myanmar and the western Sichuan Province in China.

References

Flora of China
griffithii
Near threatened plants
Taxa named by Joseph Dalton Hooker
Taxobox binomials not recognized by IUCN